Macarostola miniella is a species of moth in the family Gracillariidae. It is endemic to New Zealand. This species is only found in the North Island and the adult moths have two different colour variations.

Taxonomy
This species was first described by Baron Cajetan von Felder, Rudolf Felder and Alois Friedrich Rogenhofer in 1875 under the name Stathmopoda miniella. Edward Meyrick, thinking he was describing a new species, named it Gracilaria ethela in 1880. Meyrick synonymised this name with S. miniella in 1889. John S. Dugdale assigned this species to the genus Macraostola in 1988. The lectotype specimen is held at the Natural History Museum, London.

Description 
Meyrick described the species as follows:

The adult moths of this species come in two colour variations. The more common variation is the crimson and yellow form. The other variation has more dull fuscous colouration replacing the crimson.

Distribution 
This species is endemic to New Zealand. M. miniella is common and found throughout the North Island.

Behaviour and life history 
The larvae of M. miniella are leaf miners that later in their development also roll the leaves of their host plant, both to feed from and then to pupate in.

Habitat and host plant
This species is found in native forest habitat. The larvae are leaf miners on Syzygium maire, a tree species also endemic to New Zealand.

References

Macarostola
Moths of New Zealand
Endemic fauna of New Zealand
Moths described in 1875
Taxa named by Alois Friedrich Rogenhofer
Endemic moths of New Zealand